731 Naval Air Squadron (731 NAS) was a Naval Air Squadron of the Royal Navy's Fleet Air Arm. It was active between 1943 and 1945 and its sole role throughout its formation was a Deck Landing Control Officer training squadron. It was based out of RNAS East Haven (HMS Peewit) in Scotland, as part of the Deck Landing Training School based there.

History of 731 NAS

Deck Landing Control Officer training (1943 - 1945) 

The squadron joined with two other Naval Air Squadrons, 767 NAS, a DLT squadron and 769 NAS, a Torpedo, bomber and reconnaissance (TBR) DLT squadron. Together they formed the Deck Landing Training School at RNAS East Haven.

Training

731 NAS pilots, who were already qualified for carrier deck landing, operated a number of various Fleet Air Arm aircraft. Initially operating with Hawker Sea Hurricane and Fairey Swordfish aircraft, they flew continuous circuits and approaches to land on whichever runway was in use. This enabled the prospective DLCOs to direct their approach and familiarise themselves with the differing landing characteristics across the aircraft types operated within the Fleet Air Arm.

The runway in use was known as the 'Dummy Deck', the trainee DLCOs were known as 'Batsmen' and the repetitive work earned them the nickname 'Clockwork Mice'. A Dummy Carrier Island was introduced, in an attempt to create authenticity, in the form of a converted 1930s Albion bus and given the nickname 'H.M.S. Spurious'.

Trainee DLCOs used high visibility paddles during the day and illuminated paddles at night. The paddles were similar to tennis rackets or 'bats', hence the DLCOs being referred to as 'bats'.

The DLCO trainees had to learn the different signals used to communicate with the pilot during an intensive three week training course. Signals were given until the aircraft was committed to land, however, if the approach was deemed unsafe the trainee would 'wave him off', to go around for another approach.

Training in aircraft carrier flight deck activities and incidents was provided through the Aircraft Handling and Fire Fighting schools, both located at East Haven. Curriculum included aircraft parking and taxi after landing, simulated ready for take off manuevering, the spreading and folding of wings and fire fighting.

The training course ended with the trainees operating on an actual aircraft carriers. A number of escort aircraft carriers were assigned as Deck Landing Training (DLT) Carriers. Carriers on DLT duty included:
the Attacker-class escort carrier, HMS Ravager (D70) (January 1944)
the Ruler-class escort carrier, HMS Khedive (D62) (June 1944)
the Ruler-class escort carrier, HMS Rajah (D10) (August 1944)
the Ruler-class escort carrier, HMS Ranee (D03) (November 1944)
the Ruler-class escort carrier, HMS Speaker (D90) (November 1944)
the Ruler-class escort carrier, HMS Smiter (D55) (January - May - April 1945)
the Attacker-class escort carrier, HMS Battler (D18) (July – September 1945).

Fairey Fulmar aircraft arrived in early 1944, these being followed by Supermarine Seafire and Vought Corsair by mid year. Around December 1944 Fairey Firefly were received, with Fairey Barracuda arriving around the middle of 1945.

Disbandment

731 Naval Air Squadron was disbanded on the 1 November 1945, at RNAS East Haven.

Aircraft flown 

The squadron has flown a number of different aircraft types, including:
 Hawker Sea Hurricane Ib (Dec 1943 - Jun 1944)
 Fairey Swordfish I (Dec 1943 - Nov 1945)
 Fairey Swordfish II (Dec 1943 - Nov 1945)
 Fairey Fulmar II (Mar 1944 - Jun 1944)
 Supermarine Seafire Ib (May 1944 - Feb 1945)
 Vought F4U Corsair II (Jun 1944 - Nov 1945)
 Vought F4U Corsair III (Jun 1944 - Nov 1945)
 Fairey Swordfish III (Nov 1944 - Nov 1945)
 Fairey Firefly I (Dec 1944 - Nov 1945)
 Supermarine Seafire IIc (Feb 1945 - Nov 1945)
 Fairey Barracuda II (Jul 1945 - Nov 1945)

Naval Air Stations  

731 Naval Air Squadron operated from a single naval air station of the Royal Navy, in Scotland:
Royal Naval Air Station EAST HAVEN (5 December 1943 - 1 November 1945)

Commanding Officers 

List of commanding officers of 731 Naval Air Squadron with month and year of appointment and end:
 Lt-Cdr(A) K. Stillard, RNVR (Dec 1943 – Jan 1945)
 Lt-Cdr R. Prideham-Wippell, RN (Jan 1945 – Nov 1945)

References

Citations

Bibliography 

700 series Fleet Air Arm squadrons
Military units and formations established in 1943
Air squadrons of the Royal Navy in World War II